"Lifted" is a song written by British musical duo Lighthouse Family for their 1995 debut album, Ocean Drive. The track was produced by Mike Peden and was released as the album's lead single on 8 May 1995, reaching the top 75 in the UK. In January 1996, "Lifted" was re-released, reaching a new peak of number four in the UK and entering the top 40 in Austria, Iceland, and Ireland, as well as on the Canadian RPM Adult Contemporary chart. In the UK, it was the most-played single on radio during the first quarter of the year.

Background and release

Songwriter Paul Tucker worked in a house music club in Newcastle and had written a song called "Ocean Drive". After four years he decided to find a singer to sing it. A friend told him about singer Tunde Baiyewu from London and after singing the song, Tucker felt he was the right person to sing it. Tucker contacted several record companies and sent them the song on cassettes. Several labels showed interest and the duo signed to Polydor Records with only one song. The record company kept asking for more material. They brought in some musicians to record a few songs, but Polydor rejected the songs. 

"Lifted" came up in this process. The duo felt they needed some kind of spiritual lift. Tucker also remembered the tunes he had heard in the club where he worked, like "Promised Land" by Joe Smooth. He drew inspiration from these songs and has also stated that the song was inspired by a breakup back when he was living in Newcastle in the early 1990s. The duo had a lot of worries in the writing-process. They worried that the record company would drop them. These thoughts also fed into the lyrics of "Lifted". They sent a tape of the new song to Polydor and they loved it.

Critical reception
Ethan Alter from AllMusic picked "Lifted" as one of two "best tunes" from the album, stating that it is "virtually guaranteed to buoy one's spirits." In Billboard, the reviewer felt singer Tunde Baiyewu's style was in some ways similar to that of Seal, calling the track a "wonderful British-soul single... With its shuffling, funk-derived beat and strumming melody." James Masterton for Dotmusic called it "wonderful". Pan-European magazine Music & Media said, "Pop made from an adult angle, but finely tuning into the youngster's taste too by the clever Soul II Soul-inspired rhythm track, it will open up lots of radio possibilities." A reviewer from Music Week rated it three out of five, writing, "Feelgood, radio friendly fare from the Newcastle duo which echoes the uplifting sentiments of Gloria Gaynor's I Will Survive. A grower."
 Ralph Tee from the magazine's RM Dance Update deemed it a "wholesome guitar-tinged funky soul tune", noting that the original radio friendly version is mixed by British record producer, remixer and composer Mike Peden. Another editor, James Hamilton described it as a "husky soulful superb Roger Troutman-ishly vocodered lovely languid strolling 96.8bpm song of hope".

Music video
A music video was produced to promote the single. It features the duo performing in Zabriskie Point and Death Valley Junction, California. The indoor scenes are filmed in Amargosa Opera House and Hotel. It was shot on 35mm film, and the idea was to get something that looked more cinematic than a standard pop video.

Track listings

 UK CD1 (1995)
 "Lifted" (extended mix)
 "Beautiful Night"
 "Absolutely Everything"
 "Lifted" (7-inch instrumental)

 UK CD2 (1995)
 "Lifted" (7-inch version)
 "Lifted" (Rokstone R&B mix)
 "Lifted" (Rokstone instrumental)

 UK cassette single (1995)
 "Lifted" (7-inch version)
 "Absolutely Everything"

 European CD single (1995)
 "Lifted"
 "Beautiful Night"

 UK and Australasian CD single (1996)
 "Lifted" (7-inch mix)
 "Lifted" (Linslee extended mix)
 "Lifted" (Linslee instrumental)
 "Lifted" (Nostalgia Freaks dub)

 UK 12-inch single (1996)
A1. "Lifted" (Linslee extended mix)
A2. "Lifted" (Linslee instrumental)
B1. "Lifted" (Dekkard dub)
B2. "Lifted" (Nostalgia Freaks)

 UK cassette single and European CD single (1996)
 "Lifted" (7-inch mix)
 "Lifted" (Linslee 7-inch mix)

Charts

Weekly charts

Year-end charts

Certifications

Release history

In popular culture
The song was used as the official campaign song for the British Labour Party under Tony Blair in their successful 2001 election campaign.

References

1995 debut singles
1995 songs
1996 singles
A&M Records singles
British soul songs
Lighthouse Family songs
Polydor Records singles
Songs written by Martin Brammer
Songs written by Paul Tucker (musician)
Songs written by Tunde Baiyewu